South Shropshire is a former United Kingdom Parliamentary constituency. It was a constituency of the House of Commons of the Parliament of the United Kingdom from 1832 to 1885. It was represented by two Knights of the Shire.

The constituency was abolished, along with North Shropshire, under the Redistribution of Seats Act 1885, with effect from the 1885 general election. The county was then split into single-member constituencies: Ludlow, Newport, Oswestry and Wellington.

Boundaries
1832–1885: The Hundreds of Brimstey, Chirbury, Condover, Ford, Munslow, Overs, Purslow (including Clun) and Stoddesdon, and the Franchise of Wenlock.

Members of Parliament

Elections

Elections in the 1830s

 Whitmore retired before the poll concluded in favour of Clive

Elections in the 1840s

Vane succeeded to the peerage, becoming 2nd Duke of Cleveland and causing a by-election.

Elections in the 1850s
Bridgeman was appointed Vice-Chamberlain of the Household, requiring a by-election.

Clive's death caused a by-election.

Bridgeman was appointed Vice-Chamberlain of the Household, requiring a by-election.

Windsor-Clive's death caused a by-election.

Elections in the 1860s
Bridgeman succeeded to the peerage, becoming 3rd Earl of Bradford, causing a by-election.

 

Herbert was appointed Treasurer of the Household, requiring a by-election.

Elections in the 1870s

Herbert's death caused a by-election.

Corbett resigned, causing a by-election.

Elections in the 1880s

See also
Parliamentary constituencies in Shropshire#Historical constituencies
List of former United Kingdom Parliament constituencies
Unreformed House of Commons

References

Parliamentary constituencies in Shropshire (historic)
Constituencies of the Parliament of the United Kingdom established in 1832
Constituencies of the Parliament of the United Kingdom disestablished in 1885